Balance of Power is a Star Trek: The Next Generation novel by Dafydd Ab Hugh.

Plot summary 
When a famous Federation scientist dies, his son puts his inventions up for sale to the highest bidder—whether Federation, Klingon, Romulan or Cardassian. Among the items at auction are medical devices, engineering advances—and a photon pulse cannon capable of punching through a starship's shields with a single shot.

Meanwhile, at the Academy, Wesley Crusher comes to the aid of his best friend—and finds himself kidnapped by outlaw Ferengi bent on controlling the universe through commerce. When they also set their sights on the photon cannon, Captain Picard must find a way to save the Starship Enterprise and the Federation from the deadliest weapon ever known—with every race in the galaxy aligned against him.

Production
Following Dafydd Ab Hugh's first Star Trek novel, Fallen Heroes, he discovered that he earned more money from writing these types of books than those outside of the franchise. This and the introduction of the gold pressed latinum as a currency in Star Trek: The Next Generation and Star Trek: Deep Space Nine influenced him to write a novel about this subject matter. He stated that since latinum could not be replicated in-universe, it seemed natural to have a plot where someone discovered how to. He believed that such a plot would eventually appear elsewhere by another writer, and so decided to use it himself.

Notes

See also
Balance of Terror (Star Trek television episode)

References

External links 
Balance of Power at Fantastic Fiction

1994 American novels
Novels based on Star Trek: The Next Generation
1994 science fiction novels
American science fiction novels